Agustín de la Canal (born 10 November 1980) is an Argentine football player. He started his career with Argentine football club Ferro Carril Oeste some of his former clubs also include Olympiakos Nicosia and Club Deportivo Morón.

External links 
 Agustín De La Canal at BDFA.com.ar 

1980 births
Living people
Sportspeople from Buenos Aires Province
Argentine footballers
Argentine expatriate footballers
Ferro Carril Oeste footballers
Olympiakos Nicosia players
Nueva Chicago footballers
Club Almirante Brown footballers
Deportivo Morón footballers
Cypriot First Division players
Expatriate footballers in Cyprus
Association football midfielders
Association football defenders